Lorenzo Vázquez de Segovia was a 15th-century Spanish architect and builder noted for completing the Santa Cruz Palace in 1491 in Valladolid and a number of other handsome buildings in the Castile region of western Spain (Palace of the Dukes of Medinaceli (Cogolludo)).

Spanish architects
15th-century Spanish architects
Renaissance architects